Erie Canal: Second Genesee Aqueduct, also known as the Broad Street Aqueduct or Broad Street Bridge, is a historic stone aqueduct located at Rochester in Monroe County, New York. It was constructed in 1836–1842 and originally carried the Erie Canal over the Genesee River. It is one of four major aqueducts in the mid-19th century Erie Canal system. In 1927, a roadbed was added to carry automobile traffic and named Broad Street. It also carried a part of the Rochester Subway.

In 2018, a project called Aqueduct Reimagined was announced under the city's ROC the Riverway initiative, which proposes removing the automotive road deck to create a pedestrian space and creating walkway connections to nearby waterfront pathways. An early proposal involved partially re-flooding the former canal and subway bed on the aqueduct with water similar to the Canalside project in Buffalo, NY. An alternate concept moved into community engagement and design phases in 2022.

The aqueduct was listed on the National Register of Historic Places in 1976.

Gallery

References

External links

Erie Canal parks, trails, and historic sites
Bridges in Rochester, New York
Navigable aqueducts in the United States
Bridges completed in 1842
National Register of Historic Places in Rochester, New York
Aqueducts on the National Register of Historic Places
Transportation buildings and structures on the National Register of Historic Places in New York (state)
1842 establishments in New York (state)
Road bridges in New York (state)
Stone arch bridges in the United States
Aqueducts in New York (state)